The  is a limited express train service in Japan operated by JR Shikoku, which runs from  to ,  and .

The Ishizuchi service was introduced on 10 April 1988.

Route
The main stations served by this service are as follows.

 -  -  -  -

Rolling stock
 8000 series 2- or 3-car tilting EMUs (Takamatsu - Matsuyama services, coupled with Shiokaze services)
 8600 series 2- or 4-car tilting EMU formations since 23 June 2014

Past rolling stock

 N2000 series 5-car tilting DMUs (1994–2020)
 2000 series 2- or 3-car tilting DMUs (1994–2020)
 KiHa 181 series DMUs (1988–1993)
 KiHa 185 series DMUs (1988–1993)

References

External links

 JR Shikoku Train Information 

Named passenger trains of Japan
Shikoku Railway Company
Railway services introduced in 1988
1988 establishments in Japan